Le Mans is a  city in France.

Le Mans may also refer to:

Racing
 Circuit de la Sarthe, a race track in the city of Le Mans
 24 Hours of Le Mans, a sports car endurance race
 24 Hours of Le Mans (motorcycle race), a motorcycle endurance race
 Le Mans car, a term for sports prototype cars associated with the 24-hour race
 Le Mans Series, a European sports car endurance series (preceded by the European Le Mans Series)
 American Le Mans Series, an American sports car endurance series
 Asian Le Mans Series, an Asian sports car endurance series
 Team LeMans, auto parts maker in Shibuya, Tokyo

Vehicles 
 Le Mans Prototype, a race car type used in the 24 Hours of Le Mans and the racing series listed above
 Audi Le Mans quattro, a Audi R8's concept car produced by Audi AG
 Daewoo LeMans, a Daewoo Motors automobile
 Pontiac LeMans, a General Motors automobile
 Moto Guzzi Le Mans, a sports motorcycle

Video games
 Le Mans 24 Hours video games, including:
 LeMans (C64 game), a C64 game
 LeMans (video game), a 1976 arcade game by Atari
 WEC Le Mans, a 1986 arcade game
 Le Mans 24 (video game), an arcade game by Sega
 Test Drive Le Mans, also known as Le Mans 24 Hours

Film 
 Le Mans (film), a 1971 film starring Steve McQueen about the 24 Hours race of Le Mans
 Le Mans '66, a 2019 film starring Matt Damon and Christian Bale about the 1966 24 Hour race at Le Mans

Other sports 
 Le Mans Sarthe Basket, basketball club in Le Mans, France
 Le Mans Union Club 72, association football club in Le Mans, France

Other uses 
 Le Mans (band), a Spanish indie rock band
 Roman Catholic Diocese of Le Mans

See also

 Mans (disambiguation)